Safat Square is a major historical commercial square in Kuwait City, Kuwait.

Kuwait City